Pallathuruthy is a village in the Kuttanad region, in the  district of Alappuzha, in the state of Kerala, India.

Geography
Pallathuruthy is a water bound region surrounded by the Vembanad lake. Also, the Pallathuruthy Canal passes through the region. Like much of the rest of Kuttanad, most of the land in Pallathuruthy is used for paddy cultivation.

Tourism
Pallathuruthy is also a hub for many houseboat operators. The income from houseboats for tourists have helped the village economy.

References

Villages in Alappuzha district
Tourism in Kerala